Waverly is the name of the following historic American houses:

 Waverly House (Waverly, Iowa), on the National Register of Historic Places
 Waverly (Croom, Maryland), a historic home on the National Register of Historic Places
 Waverly (Marriottsville, Maryland), a home on the National Register of Historic Places
 Waverley (West Point, Mississippi), 19th-century mansion and National Historic Landmark; also spelled Waverly
 Waverly (Chappell Hill, Texas), on the National Register of Historic Places listings in Washington County, Texas
 Waverly (Burnt Chimney, Virginia), on National Register of Historic Places
 Waverly (Leesburg, Virginia), on the National Register of Historic Places
 Waverly (Middleburg, Virginia), on the National Register of Historic Places